Pillán Airport ,  is an airport at the southern end of an isthmus valley connecting the heads of the Reñihué and Comau Fjords in the Los Lagos Region of Chile. The valley separates the Huequi Peninsula from mainland Chile.

The airport abuts the shore of Reñihué Fjord, and south approach and departures are over the water. The valley is narrow with nearby mountainous terrain in all quadrants.

See also

Transport in Chile
List of airports in Chile

References

External links
OpenStreetMap - Pillán
OurAirports - Pillán
SkyVector - Pillán
FallingRain - Pillán Airport

Airports in Chile
Airports in Los Lagos Region